Surprise Gardener is a TV series on Home & Garden Television (HGTV) which aired from 1998 to 2003. Each week, host Susie Coelho welcomed a guest designer to perform a much needed backyard or garden makeover. Each makeover was performed in a single day.

Cast
Susie Coelho - Host
Duncan McIntosh - Landscape Designer
Tonya van der Wal - Landscape Designer
Dan Weeden - Landscape Architect
Wendy Hawker - Landscape Designer
Jill Harris - Landscape Designer
Daveena Limonick - Landscape Designer
Stephanie Rose - Landscape Designer
Michal Conor - Landscape Designer
Darrell Tsutsui - Landscape Designer
Bruce Meeks - Landscape Designer
Christopher Robbins - Landscape Designer

Crew
Gary Bernstein Executive Producer
Steven Radosh - Executive Producer
Karen Cadle - Producer
David Loitz - Producer
Tonya van der Wal - Producer
Ernesto "Tito" Romero - Producer, Director
Thomas Shull - Assistant Director
Steve Bluestein - Production Coordinator
Justin Lillge - Assistant Production Office Coordinator
Dee Dee Cecil - Production Secretary
Kirk Demorest, JE Chase- Editor
Aleksandar Sashko Jovanovic - Sound mixer

Writers
Tonya van der Wal
Thomas Shull
Stephanie Rose
Patricia Brown
Brian Wogensen

Episode guide

Season 1
SPG-101	Yard Design, Sandbox	
SPG-102	Flowers, Redwood Bark Uses	
SPG-103	Runaway Garden	
SPG-104	English Garden	
SPG-105	Low Maintenance	
SPG-106	Regaining Control	
SPG-107	Large Tree	
SPG-108	Large Yards	
SPG-109	Pool Ideas, Garden Makeover	
SPG-110	Large Yard Landscaping	
SPG-112	Rustic Garden, Split-Rail Fence	
SPG-113	Shade Plants, Inviting Yard

Season 2
SPG-201	Oriental Planting Design	
SPG-202	Dining Al Fresco	
SPG-203	Children's Backyard	
SPG-204	Limited Budget Ideas	
SPG-205	Groundcover	
SPG-206	Return to Yesteryear	
SPG-207	Geometric Yard Design	
SPG-208	Child-Friendly Yard Design	
SPG-209	Flowers All Year-Round	
SPG-210	Sandy and Windy Terrain, Terrace, Pathway	
SPG-211	Old Country Setting		
SPG-212	Evergreens and Rocks, Waterfall Focal Point	
SPG-213	Evergreens and Rocks

Season 3
SPG-301	Mountain View Design, Training Wisteria	
SPG-302	Concrete Side Yard	
SPG-303	A Stroll in the Park	
SPG-304	Creating Privacy	
SPG-305	Secret Garden	
SPG-306	Softening the Edges	
SPG-307	Nesting Bird Removal	
SPG-308	Rose Garden	
SPG-309	Creating Shade	
SPG-310	Country Garden	
SPG-311	Hillside Yard	
SPG-312	Tropical Setting	
SPG-313	Welcoming Entrance, Proper Planting, Healthy Soil, Porch
SPG-314	Informal Victorian Garden	
SPG-315	Poolside Solutions	
SPG-316	Recycled Garden, Citrus Tree Transplant, Corner Trellis
SPG-317	Safe Play Area, Easy Birdbath	
SPG-318	Small Backyard, Raised Veggie Planter, Kids' Garden	
SPG-319	Drought Tolerant	
SPG-320	Canyon Garden, "Rusted Iron" Planters, Hanging Pot Watering
SPG-321	Outdoor Living	
SPG-322	Poolside Planting	
SPG-323	Shade Garden	
SPG-324	Rock and Turf	
SPG-325	Recycled Garden	
SPG-326	Feng Shui Garden

Season 4
SPG-401	Picnic Garden	
SPG-402	Small Urban Space	
SPG-403	Neglected Yard	
SPG-404	Allergy-Free Garden	
SPG-405	A Children's Garden *Garden-based learning	
SPG-406	Cottage Garden	
SPG-407	Rooftop Garden	
SPG-408	Family Garden	
SPG-409	Effective Simplicity	
SPG-410	Painted Garden	
SPG-411	Garden Retreat	
SPG-412	Treasure Garden	
SPG-413	Secluded Garden	
SPG-414	Fiesta Garden	
SPG-415	Front Yard Garden	
SPG-416	Backyard Patio Garden	
SPG-417	A Home Outdoors	
SPG-418	Fire Station Garden	
SPG-419	A Starter Garden	
SPG-420	Resort Garden	
SPG-421	A Rustic Garden	
SPG-422	Desert Oasis	
SPG-423	Attracting Birds	
SPG-424	A Meditation Garden	
SPG-425	Asian-Style Garden	
SPG-426	A Rectangular Garden

Season 5
SPG-501	Old World Garden	
SPG-502	Paths and Flower Beds	
SPG-503	Patio Garden	
SPG-504	A Simple Garden	
SPG-505	Foundation Garden		
SPG-506	The Relaxing Hideaway Garden	
SPG-507	Shore-Side Garden	
SPG-508	Mediterranean-Style Garden	
SPG-509	The Outdoor Room	
SPG-510	Space Gardener	
SPG-511	Vine and Arbor Garden	
SPG-512	The Reading Garden	
SPG-513	Hillside Garden

Season 6
SPG-601	The Western Garden	
SPG-602	Family Garden	
SPG-603	A Whimsical Garden	
SPG-604	Recycled Items Garden	
SPG-605	The City Garden	
SPG-606	An Asian-Influenced Garden	
SPG-607	A Place to Go	
SPG-608	Trikes and Bikes Garden	
SPG-609	A Romantic Garden	
SPG-610	Gardening Without a Garden	
SPG-611	An Exotic Shade Garden	
SPG-612	A Sunny-Side Garden	
SPG-613	A Tropical Garden Party

Season 7
SPG-701	The All-Grasses Garden	
SPG-702	The Welcoming Garden	
SPG-703	No-Lawn Garden	
SPG-704	An Exotic Tropical Garden	
SPG-705	Adding Charm to an Average Garden	
SPG-706	Sprucing Up an Old Garden	
SPG-707	A Low-Maintenance Pond Garden	
SPG-708	A Cool Blue Garden	
SPG-709	A Walled Garden		
SPG-710	Circular Forms	
SPG-711	Vines and Flowers Garden	
SPG-712	A Garden for Busy People	
SPG-713	An Easy-Care Formal Yard

Season 8
SPG-801	A Cape Cod Garden
SPG-802	A Southern Garden	
SPG-803	A Side Garden	
SPG-804	A Rose and Perennial Garden	
SPG-805	 Peaceful Perennial Garden	
SPG-806	A Simple Garden	
SPG-807	An Asian-Inspired Garden	
SPG-808	Garden of Sunset Colors	
SPG-809	A Restful Garden Retreat	
SPG-810	A Garden with Curb Appeal	
SPG-811	A Patio Garden	
SPG-812	Island Bed Garden	
SPG-813	Blending in the Garden

External links
Home & Garden Television (HGTV)
Susie Coelho Enterprises
Steve Bluestein's Blog: Life Sucks Why Not Share It?

HGTV original programming